Toyin is a given name of Yoruba origin and the diminutive form of Oluwatoyin or Olutoyin.

People named Toyin
Toyin Adekale (born 1963), aka simply 'Toyin', British lovers rock singer
Toyin Falola (born 1953), Nigerian historian
Toyin Raji, Nigerian former actor
Olutoyin Augustus (born 1979), Nigerian hurdler
Toyin Odutola (born 1985), Nigerian artist
Toyin Agbetu, British activist
Oluwatoyin "Toyin" Salau, Black Lives Matter activist

Yoruba given names